Li Wei (born 9 September 1969) is a former Chinese figure skater who competed at the 1988 Winter Olympics with his partner Mei Zhibin. They finished last among the 14 pair skaters.

References

Chinese male pair skaters
1969 births
Living people
Olympic figure skaters of China
Figure skaters at the 1988 Winter Olympics